Cécile Vassort (born 2 June 1941) is a French film actress. She has starred in 45 films between 1963 and 2001.

Partial filmography

 A Woman in White (1965) - La jeune mère
 Is Paris Burning? (1966) - Une jeune femme (uncredited)
 Fleur d'oseille (1967) - Cécile
 Benjamin (1968) - Aline
 A Little Virtuous (1968) - Janine
 Angel's Leap (1971) - Luisa
 L'Italien des Roses (1972) - La mariée
 The Invitation (1973) - Aline
 Deux hommes dans la ville (1973) - Évelyne Cazeneuve
 The Clockmaker (1974) - Martine - une ouvrière
 Pleasure Party (1974) - Annie
 Malicious Pleasure (1975) - Christine
 The Judge and the Assassin (1976) - Louise Leseuer
 La situation est grave mais... pas désespérée ! (1976) - Annie, la bonne
 La Barricade du point du jour (1978) - Leila
 5% de risque (1980) - La fille de la boîte de nuit
 The Lady of the Camellias (1981) - Henriette
 One Deadly Summer (1983) - Josette
 Blanche et Marie (1985) - Woman at police
 Three Men and a Cradle (1985) - Annick
 Le testament d'un poète juif assassiné (1988) - Sheina Rosenblum
 Adieu, je t'aime (1988) - Valérie
 La Lumière des étoiles mortes (1994) - Louise
 Mo''' (1996) - Mme Bernard
 Captain Conan (1996) - Georgette
 A Crime in Paradise'' (2001)

References

External links

1941 births
Living people
French film actresses
French television actresses
20th-century French actresses
21st-century French actresses